Wendy Selig-Prieb (born 1960) is an American businesswoman who is best known for her work as president of the Milwaukee Brewers organisation.  She is the daughter of former MLB commissioner Bud Selig.

Biography

Selig-Prieb graduated from Tufts University in 1982, and earned her Juris Doctor from Marquette University Law School in 1988, she worked as a corporate attorney for Foley & Lardner before joining the Brewers.

During her tenure as an executive with the Milwaukee Brewers, Selig-Prieb was the only female president and chairman of a Major League Baseball Club. As part of management's Labor Committee in 1994–1995, Selig-Prieb was the first woman to represent Major League Baseball in its collective bargaining with the MLB Players Association.  She served on numerous other committees for Baseball and represented the Brewers at Major League meetings from September 1992-January 2005.

As of 2014 Selig-Prieb served on the Board of Directors of Delaware North, a Buffalo, New York-based hospitality company.  She is also a Director of Worth LTD, a direct-to-consumer fashion company.  

Prior to assuming this position, Selig-Prieb spent two years as president of Worth New York, the flagship brand of Worth.

References

Major League Baseball owners
Major League Baseball executives
Milwaukee Brewers executives
Milwaukee Brewers owners
Tufts University alumni
Living people
Businesspeople from Milwaukee
American chief executives of professional sports organizations
American women chief executives
American chief executives of fashion industry companies
Marquette University alumni
University School of Milwaukee alumni
1960 births
21st-century American women